Darbyshire is a surname. Notable people with the surname include:

Alfred Darbyshire (1839–1908), English architect
Beatrice Darbyshire (1901–1988), Australian artist
Carolyn Darbyshire (aka Carolyn Darbyshire-McRorie and Carolyn McRorie) (born 1963), Canadian curler
George Christian Darbyshire (1820–1898), English and Australian civil engineer
Janet Darbyshire (born ?), British epidemiologist and science administrator
Maureen Darbyshire (born ?), English actress
Michael Darbyshire (c. 1917–1979), British television actor
Russell Darbyshire (1880–1948), British Anglican priest
Sam Darbyshire (born 1989), British television actor
Thomas Darbyshire (1518–1604), English churchman and Jesuit

See also
Darbyshire railway station, located in Victoria, Australia
Mount Darbyshire, a bare rock mountain in the Antarctic

English toponymic surnames